Norman Elliott Kent. (born 18 October 1949 in Brooklyn, New York) is a South Florida criminal defense attorney, publisher and radio talk show host.

The founder and publisher of The Express, in 1999, and South Florida Gay News in 2009. Kent was previously the morning drive talk show host for WFTL-1400 AM from 1989-1992, when he left the station by quitting on-air. As an attorney, Kent has brought suit against local governments in Florida on behalf of civil rights such as Freedom of Speech many times.

A frequent guest lecturer at colleges and in community forums, Kent has published numerous articles advocating for civil rights protections for the LGBT community and the legalization of cannabis in the United States. He has authored 'The Pot Warriors Manifesto.' His articles on representing gay men illegally entrapped by law enforcement, along with illegal searches by law enforcement has been picked up by the National Academy of Criminal Defense Lawyer's magazine, The Champion.

Kent's clientele has consisted of the prominent late radio talk show host, Neil Rogers, and talents Phil Hendrie and Al Rantel. He also assisted in the civil rights defense of activist Dan Choi during his White House protests, along with numerous South Florida celebrities and personalities who had legal encounters and challenges with law enforcement. Al Goldstein's SCREW magazine also had a formidable defender with Norm Kent as his counsel.

After surviving a bout with lymphoma, he had another stint at the new WFTL-850 AM from 2002-2005 as a daily talk show host, though in the interim periods he hosted 'Weekend Legal'  on various local radio stations, including WWNN-1170 AM.

Norm is a life member of the National Academy of Criminal Defense Lawyers, the Florida Criminal Defense Lawyers Association, and has appeared on Dateline, Court TV, Fox News and Friends, as well as CNN Live, as a political and legal commentator. In 2014, as the Chair of the Board of Directors of NORML, he has been a frequent guest on HLN's Nancy Grace Show, advocating for the legalization of cannabis. As a constitutional rights attorney, he has represented juveniles in a class action against detention centers, and sued to enjoin the State of Florida from illegally spraying paraquat on marijuana fields.

A graduate of both Hofstra University in 1971 and the Hofstra School of Law in 1975, Kent relocated to Fort Lauderdale, Florida in 1976, where he has maintained an independent law practice for over 40 years, practicing today as the Criminal Defense Law Center of South Florida, alongside his law partner, Russell Lonnie Cormican.

Marijuana legalization advocacy 
A longtime advocate for marijuana law reform, he serves presently as the Chairman Emeritus of the Board of Directors of the National Organization for Reform of Marijuana Laws (NORML), contributed articles to High Times Magazine, During his long career, he has successfully represented clients who defended marijuana use based on medical necessity, such as Elvy Mussika, who now receives cannabis supplies quarterly from the DEA. As far back as 1972, Norm Kent was involved in Hofstra and NY NORML. It was in 1982, as a Florida attorney, that he sued the United States for an injunction to bar the spraying of the toxic herbicide paraquat onto marijuana fields inside the state. The government eventually abandoned the plan. In December 2012, the National Legal Committee of NORML awarded Norm Kent with its highest honor, the Al Horn Memorial Award for Lifetime Achievement.

In 2007, his defense of marijuana decriminalization led to a national debate with a former classmate at Hofstra University, then U.S. Senator, Norm Coleman from Minnesota. Kent published a response letter at Celebstoner.com outing Coleman's contemporary positions on marijuana law reform, comparing it to his days as a user when he was a college student and classmate. Norm Kent and Norm Coleman were college classmates and the letter from Kent revealed the hypocrisy of Coleman's "war on drugs" position considering the way they used to "tape the doors shut and burn incense" during their college days together. This became a talking point during Coleman's 2008 campaign against Al Franken.

LGBT advocacy and newspapers 
Norm Kent began Express Gay News in South Florida in 1999 - an LGBT newspaper in Broward County. Four years later it was sold to Window Media to be a part of their larger umbrella of national gay media sources. It was then re-titled The Express and then The South Florida Blade. On November 16, 2009, all publications under Window Media management were shut down because of the financial status of its parent company, Window Media and its majority stockholder, Avalon Equity Partners.

Norm Kent now publishes   South Florida Gay News.com, which has emerged to become the largest, award-winning gay weekly newspaper in the State of Florida, with over 500 drop-off points from Key West to West Palm Beach, and St. Pete to Orlando. SFGN also publishes The MIRROR Magazine, a full-size, content-driven, glossy LGBT quarterly.

References

External links
  Norm Kent's website
  Broward Law Blog
  South Florida Gay News.com

1949 births
Living people
American cannabis activists
American lawyers
American talk radio hosts
Hofstra University alumni
People from Brooklyn
People from Fort Lauderdale, Florida
Maurice A. Deane School of Law alumni